The Société Minière et Industrielle du Kivu (Sominki) was a privately held mining company of Zaire.
It operated gold and tin mines, mostly in South Kivu province, between 1974 and 1997.
The acquisition of its mining assets by Banro Corporation of Canada was complicated by the First Congo War in 1996–1997, followed by expropriation of the mines by the new Democratic Republic of the Congo (DRC) government. 
Eventually Banro gained the right to exploit the gold mines.

Foundation

In 1973 Cobelmin Zaire, a subsidiary of the Compagnie Belge d'Entreprises Minières, was owner of five small mining companies: Minière des Grands Lacs (MGL), Kinoretain, Kundamines, Minerga and Miluba.
Cobelmin and MGL were both located at Kamituga in Kivu Province, which had a large gold mine and was in the center of the tin-bearing cassiterite region.
Kivumines, Phibraki, Somikubi and Symetain were also active in the region in 1973.
Philips Brothers Sobaki owned 75% and 50% respectively of Kivumines and Phibraki.

The mining companies in Kivu Province were merged in three phases.
First, the Cobelmin companies were unified.
Second, on 1 April 1974 Cobelmin began to administer Kivumines, Phibraki and Somikubi as one while the legal arrangements were being sorted out.
The Société Minière et Industrielle du Kivu (Sominki) was created to hold all the mining assets by a convention of 31 May 1974.
In March 1976 Sominki took over Syndicat Miniere de l'Etain (Symetain), completing the merger.
The state held 28% of shares in Sominki, but the Empain group was the majority shareholder.

Operations

Sominki owned most of the mines in South Kivu from the late 1970s to the early 1990s, with 12 gold concessions and 35 tin concessions.
Sominki established a single purchasing office in Kinshasa for mining equipment and supplies. 
In October 1985 the London Metal Exchange recorded the largest crash in tin prices in its history. 
The Empain group, which owned 72% of the Sominki shares, looked for buyers.
However, the only interest came from companies that only wanted the gold concessions, while the government of Zaire would not accept a buyer who would not also take on the tin concessions. 

In 1996 the assets of Sominki included gold, tin and tantalum concessions and land holdings.
It had ten mining permits and 47 mining concessions covering an area of 
The First Congo War broke out in 1996 and the country became chaotic.

Dissolution

In January 1996 African Mineral Resources Inc. (AMRI), a subsidiary of Banro Resource Corporation of Canada, and Mines D'Or du Zaire (MDDZ) bought the outstanding 64% of privately held shares of Sominki for $3.5 million.
AMRI and MDZZ now each owned 36% of Sominki, while the government of Zaire held the remaining 28%.
In December 1996 Banro acquired MDDZ's 36% share.
Early in 1997 Société Aurifère du Kivu et du Maniema (Sakima) was created to acquire the gold assets of Sominki.
Banro agreed to invest $15 million in Sakima in exchange for a 10 year post-production tax moratorium, waived import duties and the right to export all gold production.
Banro held 93% of Sakima and the government held 7%.
In February 1997 Banro signed a convention with the Zaire government under which Sakima took over Sominki's mining projects.
Sakima concentrated on the Namoya and Twangiza deposits.
On 29 March 1997 Sominki was put into liquidation.

Later events

In May 1997 the government of Mobutu Sese Seko was overthrown when Kinshasa fell to the forces of the Alliance of Democratic Forces for the Liberation of Congo (ADFL) led by Laurent-Désiré Kabila.
In June 1997 the ADFL government confirmed Banro's concession, and Sakima launched its $10 million exploration and development project.
In October 1997 Sakima leased the tin concessions to Ressources Minérales Africaines (RMA).
On 29 July 1998 President Laurent Kabila expropriated Sakima's assets and transferred the mining licenses to the Société des Mines du Congo (Somico), a new state-owned enterprise.
Banro began a process to dispute the expropriation.

In 2001 Joseph Kabila succeeded his father as president.
On 18 April 2002 Banro and the DRC government signed an Amicable Settlement Agreement.
Sakima was reinstated, with the government the sole owner.
Banro reacquired the gold concessions, and created four subsidiaries to exploit them.

On 26 February 2016 five former employees of Sominki filed a Request for Review to the Canadian National Contact Point (NCP) on the OECD Guidelines for Multinational Enterprises.
They claimed to represent 4,987 ex-employees of Sominki, and asserted that Banro Corporate had not complied with the OECD guidelines.
Under the 2002 agreement where Banro had regained the gold concession Banro had agreed to seek closure of Sominki, assuming the government paid what it owed.
In 2010 Banro agreed to contribute US$200,000 as a goodwill contribution to the assets that Sominki would use for final payment of accounts to employees.
A 14-person committee with Banro and government representatives would oversee the liquidation.
This committee never met.
The NCP concluded that the liquidation process was not complete, and recommended that Banro try to engage with the government to complete the process.

Notes

Citations

Sources

 

1974 establishments in Zaire
Non-renewable resource companies established in 1974
Mining companies of the Democratic Republic of the Congo
Defunct mining companies
History of the Democratic Republic of the Congo
Non-renewable resource companies disestablished in 1997
Companies disestablished in 1997
1997 disestablishments in Zaire